Aliaksei Tsapik (born 4 August 1988) is a Belarusian athlete who competes in the triple jump and long jump with a personal best result of 16.82 metres at the triple jump.

Tsapik won the bronze medal at the 2012 European Athletics Championships in Helsinki at the triple jump.

Competition record

External links 
 

1988 births
Living people
Belarusian male long jumpers
Belarusian male triple jumpers
European Athletics Championships medalists